David Ferrer successfully defended his title by defeating Nicolás Almagro 7–6(7–4), 6–7(2–7), 6–2 in the final.

Seeds

Qualifying

Draw

Finals

Top half

Bottom half

References
 Main Draw
 Qualifying Draw

Abierto Mexicano Telcel - Singles
2011 Abierto Mexicano Telcel